Joan López Elo (born 1 March 1999), known as Joanet, is an Equatorial Guinean professional footballer who plays as a midfielder for CE Sabadell FC and the Equatorial Guinea national team.

Early life
Joanet was born in Alcoletge to a Spanish father and a Equatoguinean Bubi mother.

International career
Joanet was first called up for Equatorial Guinea national team in November 2019. He made his debut on 28 March 2021.

Career statistics

International

References

External links

1999 births
Living people
Sportspeople from the Province of Lleida
People from Segrià
Footballers from Catalonia
Citizens of Equatorial Guinea through descent
Equatoguinean footballers
Association football midfielders
Equatorial Guinea international footballers
Spanish footballers
Equatoguinean sportspeople of Spanish descent
Spanish sportspeople of Equatoguinean descent
Segunda División B players
Lleida Esportiu footballers